Dichomeris rhizogramma is a moth in the family Gelechiidae. It was described by Edward Meyrick in 1923. It is found in Brazil.

The forewings are fuscous, sprinkled with blackish and irregularly streaked with dark fuscous suffusion and black sprinkling between the veins and on the fold. There is a rather narrow dark fuscous fascia around the apex and termen. The hindwings are dark grey.

References

Moths described in 1923
rhizogramma